Galatea Ranzi (born 24 January 1967) is an Italian film, stage and television actress.

Life and career 
Born in Rome, Ranzi studied acting at the Accademia Nazionale di Arte Drammatica Silvio D'Amico, graduating in 1988. She made her stage debut in 1987, in Luca Ronconi's Amor nello specchio, then she worked in numerous other productions directed by Ronconi, as well as in works directed by Cesare Lievi and Massimo Castri, among others.

Ranzi made her film debut in 1993, in Paolo and Vittorio Taviani's Fiorile, and for her performance she was nominated to Nastro d'Argento for best actress. In 2005, she was nominated to David di Donatello for best supporting actress thanks to her performance in Giuseppe Piccioni's The Life That I Want.

In 2014, she was nominated to David di Donatello for best supporting actress for her performance in Paolo Sorrentino's The Great Beauty.

Selected filmography  
Fiorile (1993)
Piccoli orrori (1993)
Va' dove ti porta il cuore (1996)
Appassionate (1999) 
A Journey Called Love (2002)
Caterina in the Big City (2003) 
Il pranzo della domenica (2003)
The Life That I Want (2004)
Pontormo – un amore eretico (2004) 
Tre metri sopra il cielo (2004)
The Fine Art of Love (2005) 
Ho voglia di te (2007)  
Aria (2009) 
The Great Beauty (2013)
What a Beautiful Surprise (2015)
The Girl in the Fog (2017)
Baby (2018, TV series)

Awards and nominations
2005 nominated to David di Donatello for Best Supporting Actress for her performance in The Life That I Want
2014 nominated to David di Donatello for Best Supporting Actress for her performance in The Great Beauty

References

External links 
 

Italian film actresses
Italian television actresses
Italian stage actresses
1967 births
Actresses from Rome
Living people
Accademia Nazionale di Arte Drammatica Silvio D'Amico alumni